The Scar is a lost 1919 American silent film drama directed by Frank Hall Crane and starring Kitty Gordon. It was produced and distributed by World Film Company.

Plot summary

Cast
 Kitty Gordon as Cora
 Irving Cummings as George Reynolds
 Jennie Ellison as Mrs. Reynolds
 Eric Mayne as Hastings
 Charles Dungan as Cavanaugh
 Frank Farrington as Thaddeus Tabor
 Ruth Findlay as Frances Tabor
 Paul Doucet as Valdez
 David Herblin as Caryl Haskill
 Herbert Bradshaw as Willard
 Amelie Barleon as Cora's Maid (credited as Amelia Barleon)

References

External links
 
 
 

1919 films
American silent feature films
Films directed by Frank Hall Crane
Lost American films
American black-and-white films
Silent American drama films
1919 drama films
World Film Company films
1919 lost films
Lost drama films
1910s American films